Disney's High School Musical: A Seleção (Disney's High School Musical: The Selection) is a reality television game show, which debuted March 15, 2008 on Disney Channel Brazil.

Its objective is to find an actor and an actress to perform in the movie High School Musical: O Desafio. It is aired on Saturdays, at 7 pm and it is aired on Canal SBT too.

Renata Ferreira and Olavo Cavalheiro were named the winners on the Season Finale, where it was June 21, 2008. Paula Barbosa and Felipe Guadanucci, were the runners-up.

Judges

Top 18 Contestants

Call-out order

 The contestant was in bottom 3
 The contestant was in bottom 2
 The contestant was eliminated
 The contestant won the competition

Statistics
 Contestants with the most collective bottom two appearances: Carolina, Victor & Moroni, 2 times
 Contestants with the most consecutive bottom two appearances: Beatriz & Moroni, 2 times
 Contestants with the most collective bottom three appearances: Beatriz, 3 times
 Contestants with the most consecutive bottom three appearances: Beatriz & Samuel, 2 times
 Contestants with no bottom three appearance: Paula
 Contestants with no bottom two appearance: Paula, Fellipe & Renata
 Contestants with most collective first callouts: Karol, Paula,  & Renata, 2 times
 Contestants with most consecutive first callouts: Karol, 2 times

Sistema Brasileiro de Televisão original programming
High School Musical (franchise) mass media
Brazilian reality television series
Disney Channels Worldwide original programming
Portuguese-language Disney Channel original programming
Disney Channel (Latin American TV channel) original programming
2000s high school television series